Dr. Jacqueline Marie Cruz (born 2 December 1986) is an American-born Puerto Rican footballer who played as a defender.

Club career
Cruz previously played for WPSL sides San Francisco Nighthawks, California Storm, and BV Cloppenburg, Magdeburg FFC, and USV Jena in Germany's 1st and 2nd Bundesliga. She also played on the Puerto Rico women's national team.

Business career
Cruz graduated in 2015 with an MBA at Arizona State University while playing professional football. Currently, she is Head of International Communication at Eintracht Frankfurt Fussball AG since 2018 and graduated with her Doctorate in Economics (Dr. rer oec.) at the HHL Leipzig Graduate School of Management in Economics on the topics of professional football management and sustainability in February 2022.

References

1986 births
Living people
Women's association football defenders
Puerto Rican women's footballers
Puerto Rico women's international footballers
Puerto Rican expatriate women's footballers
Puerto Rican expatriate sportspeople in Germany
American women's soccer players
Soccer players from California
People from San Mateo, California
San Jose State Spartans women's soccer players
California State University, East Bay alumni
Women's Premier Soccer League players
California Storm players
American expatriate women's soccer players
American expatriate soccer players in Germany
American sportspeople of Puerto Rican descent